Walter L M Russ was a  cargo ship built in 1927 in Rostock, Germany. In 1945, she was seized by the Allies and passed to the Ministry of War Transport (MoWT). It was intended that she would be renamed Empire Concourse but in July 1945 she ran aground between Wales and Ireland, and was wrecked.

Description
The ship was built in 1927 by Neptun AG, Rostock, Germany.

She had a GRT of 1,538 and a NRT of 890.

The engine was built by AG Neptun.

History
Walter L M Russ was built for Ernst Russ, Hamburg. The Code Letters RGJK were allocated. In 1934, her Code Letters were changed to DHZG. On 2 March 1936, she was in collision with the German schooner Condor in the Kaiser Wilhelm Canal. The schooner sank.

Walter L M Russ was seized by the Allies in May 1945 at Schleswig in Germany and was passed to the British MoWT. It was intended that she would be renamed Empire Concourse, but on 15 July 1945 she ran aground at Grassholm in St George's Channel and was wrecked. Nine crew were rescued by the Angle Lifeboat, the Elizabeth Elson. James Watkins, the lifeboat's Coxwain, was awarded a RNLI Bronze Medal for his part in the rescue.

References

External links
Photograph of Walter L M Russ

1927 ships
Ships built in Rostock
Steamships of Germany
Merchant ships of Germany
World War II merchant ships of Germany
Ministry of War Transport ships
Empire ships
Steamships of the United Kingdom
Maritime incidents in July 1945
Shipwrecks in the Bristol Channel
Wreck diving sites in Wales
1945 in Wales